Places to Visit is an extended play released by British group Saint Etienne in May 1999. It shows the band moving toward the experimental electronic sound that they explored further on their next official full-length release, 2000's Sound of Water.

Originally released in 1999 in the US only on Sub Pop, German label Bungalow released a vinyl version in 2000. The German release included as a bonus track "Garage for Gunther", the B-side to "52 Pilot".

The EP appeared in its entirety on the second disc of the 2009 deluxe edition reissue of Sound of Water, also marking the first UK release of the tracks.

"Sadie's Anniversary" and "Half Timbered" are tracks omitted from the Misadventures Of Margaret soundtrack. Sadie is incidentally the name of the band's longtime backing singer's daughter. Debsey, the backing singer, has been with the band since the early days of them performing live. She is also Sarah Cracknell's sister-in-law.

"We're in the City" is featured in the 1999 film But I'm a Cheerleader.

Reception

Places to Visit received mixed reviews from the majority of critics.

Track listing

CD: Sub Pop / SPCD 466

LP: Bungalow / bung074

Personnel
 Saint Etienne
 Sarah Cracknell - Vocals, Wurlitzer, Beetle Bailey
 Bob Stanley - Keyboards, Cymbaline, Four Bagger
 Pete Wiggs - Keyboards, Black Island, Turkey

Additional personnel
 Ian Catt - Keyboards, E-bow
 Charlotte Hodson, Mitch Stevenson - Backing Vocals
 Gerard Johnson - Keyboards, Piano 
 Ian Masterson - Programming
 John Miller - Drums
 Dominic Murcott - Vibes, Marimba
 Sean O'Hagan - Bass, 12 String Guitar, Organ
 Jim O'Rourke - Electronic Wizardry
 The Trouser Enthusiast - Engineer ("We're in the City")

References

1999 EPs
Saint Etienne (band) albums
Sub Pop EPs